Caucaia is a Brazilian municipality in the state of Ceará.  As of 2020, it has a population of 365,212. It is home of the Tapeba tribe, a native group organized in 17 villages around the metropolitan region of Fortaleza. Caucaia has the second biggest GDP of Ceara state, thanks to the industries surrounding the port of Pecem, and it is attracting several investors interested in installing offshore windfarms and dessalination plants in the municipality.

Geography
Caucaia is close to the capital city of Fortaleza and is home to a state garden park. There is a market in the center of the town with fish, fruits, and souvenirs for the tourists. Caucaia can be reached by the train that departs from the center of the city by the Feiras in downtown. Buses depart to and from the city that can be accessed from Rodoviarias (bus stations).

Caucaia has a diverse landscape, with beaches, hills and valleys. For nature lovers, popular sights for hiking are the Serra da Rajada and Serra do Jua.

Main sights
Caucaia is a popular destination for kitesurfing, as it has an extensive coastline suitable for the practice of diverse aquatic sports and good weather conditions throughout the whole year, being the season between July and November the windiest. The beach of Cumbuco and the Cauipe lagoon are the hotspots of kitesurfers. March and April are known as swell season, therefore many surfers go to Icarai beach in search of good waves.

At the center of the city sits a church. Masses are held throughout the week and many of the local people walk around the square at night.  There are stalls with cheap "bon bons" (little candies) and other treats.

Caucaia has a museum of Cashew where visitors can appreciate local handcraft art and cuisine.

References

External links

Populated coastal places in Ceará
Municipalities in Ceará